David Creamer (born 9 December 1942) is a former international table tennis player and professional golfer from England.

Table tennis career
Creamer represented England at the 1963 World Table Tennis Championships in the Swaythling Cup (men's team event) with Chester Barnes,  Ian Harrison and Bryan Merrett. He also won an English National title in 1964, in the doubles with Johnny Leach.

Golf career
Creamer turned professional in 1966. Until he reached 50, Creamer played little top-level golf, although he qualified for the 1980 Open Championship at Muirfield where he missed the cut. He played regularly on the European Senior Tour from 1993 to 2007, competing in over 200 events. He was twice in the top 10 of the money list, in 1997 and 2000. Creamer won once, the Energis Senior Masters at Wentworth in 2000. He was a runner-up 6 times, including the PGA Seniors Championship in 1994 and the Lawrence Batley Seniors in 2002, where he lost in a playoff.

Professional wins (1)

European Senior Tour wins (1)

European Senior Tour playoff record (0–1)

Team appearances
Diamondhead Cup (representing Great Britain and Ireland): 1974
Praia d'El Rey European Cup: 1997 (winners)

See also
 List of England players at the World Team Table Tennis Championships

References

External links 

English male table tennis players
English male golfers
European Senior Tour golfers
People from Perivale
1942 births
Living people